Naps or NAPS may refer to:

Napolitains, small pieces of chocolate
Naparima College, Trinidad and Tobago
Naps (rapper) (born 1991), French rapper of Algerian descent
NAPS team, an Italian software house based in Messina, Sicily

Abbreviations
Narora Atomic Power Station
Nishnawbe-Aski Police Service, First Nations agency, Canada

See also
Nap (disambiguation), also includes NAP
Cleveland Indians, baseball team, formerly Cleveland Naps
Nissan NAPS (Nissan Anti Pollution System)